Gone Crazy is a 1973 album by Grin. It was the band's final album.

The original album was a gatefold. The outside front and back covers feature a colorful drawing, by Lanny Tupper, of animals, dishes, and musical instruments going crazy. A photo of Nils Lofgren doing a flip is also on the front cover. The inside cover has nineteen photos of the band, performing and hanging out with an old man, identified as Mr. Carter.

Critical reception
The Rolling Stone Album Guide called the harder numbers "the toughest and most assured the band ever produced."

Track listing 
All tracks composed by Nils Lofgren

Side One:
 "You're the Weight" - 5:11
 "Boy and Girl" - 4:31
 "What About Me" - 4:27
 "One More Time" - 5:10

Side Two:
 "True Thrill" - 3:08
 "Beggar's Day (Eulogy to Danny Whitten)" - 4:18
 "Nightmare" - 3:42
 "Believe" - 3:55
 "Ain't for Free" - 4:17

Personnel
Grin
 Nils Lofgren - guitars, keyboards, lead vocals
 Bob Berberich - drums, lead vocals
 Bob Gordon - bass, backing vocals
 Tom Lofgren - guitars, backing vocals

Etc.
These liner notes are written in script around the photograph and are hard to read, so some spelling may be wrong.
 For their invaluable assistance on and off the road, thanks to our friends Jimmy Foster, Tom Miller and John Lockbridge.
 Special thanks to Clydie M. King, Sherlie Matthews and Merry Clayton for behind vocals.
 For all artwork, cover & back, thanks to Lonnie Tupper (Lanny Tupper) for his talents & interest above and beyond the call of duty.
 Management - "Smart" Art Linson.
 Photography Connie Sprague (cover photo) & R. Ottinger.
 Engineered by David Briggs w/ Bob, Bill & Gabby
 Recorded at Bias.
 We are deeply grateful to Bobbye Hall for all her percussion work.

References
All information from album cover and label, unless otherwise noted.

1973 albums
Nils Lofgren albums
Albums produced by David Briggs (producer)
A&M Records albums